Steven Portenga is a retired NASCAR driver. He spent more than 2 decades racing in various national and regional support series to NASCAR Sprint Cup Series, and he won the NASCAR Featherlite Southwest Tour championship for late models in 1994 and 1998. Portenga and his wife, Windi, are now car owners of the #21 & #31 cars in the NASCAR K&N Pro Series West, where he's also the crew chief for one of those drivers, Alex Schutte.

Portenga won his first racing championship in 1991 at Silver State Raceway in the Winston Racing Series. In 1995, he competed full-time in the Craftsman Truck Series, winning one pole and finishing in the top-ten three times, finishing 13th in points.

He ran six races the following year, his best finish 15th at Phoenix International Raceway. In 1999, he made his Busch Series debut at Pikes Peak International Raceway, finishing 41st. He also attempted to make his Winston Cup debut at Sears Point International Raceway, but failed to qualify.

In 2001, he returned to the trucks, running two races for MacDonald Motorsports and one race in his own truck, finishing fourteenth at Kansas Speedway. He ran two races the next year, posting two top-tens. He attempted Phoenix with Ware Racing Enterprises in the Cup series, but missed the race.

Motorsports career results

NASCAR
(key) (Bold - Pole position awarded by qualifying time. Italics - Pole position earned by points standings or practice time. * – Most laps led.)

Nextel Cup Series

Busch Series

Camping World Truck Series

External links
 
 Steve Portenga Driver Card

Living people
1970 births
Sportspeople from Sparks, Nevada
Racing drivers from Nevada
NASCAR drivers
NASCAR team owners